Super Strings is an album by bassist Ron Carter which was recorded in 1981 and released on the Milestone label.

Reception

The AllMusic review by Alex Henderson called it an "enjoyable (if less than essential) LP", stating: "Jazz-with-strings projects are often examples of mood music or easy listening; this LP, however, is more diverse than that." On All About Jazz, Derek Taylor said: "Hiring on an entire string orchestra Carter takes a stab at placing his virtuosity in front of a lushly orchestrated backdrop and ends up with bromidic mood music ... Carter's career ranks among the most prolific in jazz, and as such the overproduction and narcissism that spoil this a date make it one best left a forgotten entry."

Track listing
All compositions by Ron Carter except where noted.
 "Bom Dia" – 6:43
 "Don't Misunderstand" (Gordon Parks) – 6:15
 "Super Strings" – 7:30
 "Bitin'" – 5:25
 "No Flowers, Please" – 5:15
 "Uptown Conversation" – 10:49

Personnel
Ron Carter – piccolo bass, bass, arranger
Kenny Barron – piano
John Tropea – guitar
Jack DeJohnette – drums
Ralph MacDonald – percussion
Sanford Allen – concertmaster, violin
Lamar Alsop, Sandra Billingslea, Harry Cykman, Glenn Dicterow, Kenneth Gordon, Stanley Hunte, Alfio Micci, Marion Pinheiro, John Pintavalle, Richard Young – violin
Jesse Levine, Maxine Roach, Harry Zaratzian – viola
Charles McCracken, Kermit Moore, Eugene Moye Jr. – cello
Leon Maleson – contrabass
Wade Marcus – string arranger

References

Milestone Records albums
Ron Carter albums
1981 albums
albums arranged by Wade Marcus